The Horseshoe Pass ("Pass of the Cold Stream") is a mountain pass in Denbighshire, north-east Wales. It separates Llantysilio Mountain to the west from the 565 metre (1,854 feet) mountain and Marilyn Cyrn-y-Brain to the east. The road travels in a horseshoe shape around the sides of a valley, giving the pass its English name. In 2022, a proposal for a 40 mph speed limit on the Horseshoe Pass was approved after a lengthy campaign by Llangollen's county councillors.

This route dates from 1811, when a turnpike road was constructed across the area.  As with the rest of the roads in the Clwydian Range, it is not uncommon for sheep to gather in the road, sometimes causing problems for drivers. The road is also frequently closed in winter due to snowfall or landslides.

The Pass is well known for the Ponderosa cafe at its highest point and the scenic views along the road.  Both the cafe and the pass itself are extremely popular with cyclists and motorcyclists.  There are many walks and routes in the immediate area that are popular with hikers, and there are a number of campsites nearby.

The area was devastated by wildfires in 2018 which broke out 19 July, and continued until 25th September, damaging 715 acres of land.

Gallery

References

 Llandegla Millennium Action Group (2003) Llandegla Then and Now, LMAG, Llandegla.

External links
 Historic Landscape Characterisation - The Vale of Llangollen: Maesyrychen, Clwyd-Powys Archaeological Trust
 Horseshoe Pass walk, BBC
 HorseShoe Pass Denbighshire, Positively North Wales

Mountain passes of Denbighshire
Roads in Denbighshire
Scenic routes in the United Kingdom